Huitoni or Wit'uni (Aymara wit'u spur, -ni a suffix to indicate ownership, "the one with a spur", Hispanicized spelling Huitoni) is a mountain in the Moquegua Region in the Andes of Peru, about  high. It is situated in the General Sánchez Cerro Province, Ubinas District. Huitoni lies northeast of the active volcano Ubinas and southwest of Pirhuane and Pacoorcco.

See also 
 Salinas and Aguada Blanca National Reservation

References 

Mountains of Peru
Mountains of Moquegua Region